Peter "Pedro" Richards (11 November 1956 – 23 December 2001) was an English footballer who played in defence for Notts County.

The son of a Black British father and a Spanish mother, Richards was taken by his mother at an early age to Laguardia, Álava and lived there until the age of 11 when they moved to Nottingham. Richards was taken on as an apprentice at County and signed professional for them in November 1974. He made 399 league appearances for County, his sole Football League club. He was a home crowd favorite particularly because of his sure tackling and consistency.

Richards left County at the age of 29 and continued playing semi-professional football for Boston United, Oakham United, Corby Town and Arnold Town. He died in 2001 from a rare strain of pneumonia.

Personal life
His son Jordan is also a footballer.

References

1956 births
2001 deaths
English footballers
Notts County F.C. players
Boston United F.C. players
Corby Town F.C. players
People from Edmonton, London
English people of Spanish descent
Deaths from pneumonia in England
Oakham United F.C. (Nottinghamshire) players
Arnold Town F.C. players
Association football defenders